There have been two baronetcies created for descendants of the ancient 12th-century border family of Heron of Ford Castle, Northumberland.

The Heron Baronetcy, of Chipchase, was created on 20 November 1662 in the Baronetage of England by Charles II for Cuthbert Heron of Chipchase Castle, Northumberland in recognition of the loyalty shown to the King's father Charles I.
The 5th Baronet, whose father changed his name upon marriage into the Myddleton family, was the nephew of the 3rd Baronet. The baronetcy became extinct on his death in 1801.

The Heron Baronetcy, of Newark upon Trent, was created in the Baronetage of Great Britain on 25 August 1778 for Richard Heron, Chief Secretary for Ireland 1777–80. He was succeeded by his nephew, the 2nd Baronet, who was member of parliament for Grimsby 1812–1818 and for Peterborough 1819–47. The baronetcy became extinct on his death in 1854.

Heron baronets, of Chipchase (1662)
 Sir Cuthbert Heron, 1st Baronet (–1688)
 Sir John Heron, 2nd Baronet (1654–1693)
 Sir Charles Heron, 3rd Baronet (died 1704)
 Sir Henry Heron, 4th Baronet (1696–1749)
 Sir Thomas Myddleton, 5th Baronet (1723–1801)

Note:- Some sources show Charles Heron (1748–1749) as the 5th Baronet and Thomas Myddleton as the 6th Baronet.

Heron baronets, of Newark upon Trent (1778)
 Sir Richard Heron, 1st Baronet (1726–1805)
 Sir Robert Heron, 2nd Baronet (1765–1854)

References

   Stirnet Pedigree of Heron
 

Extinct baronetcies in the Baronetage of England
Extinct baronetcies in the Baronetage of Great Britain
Baronetcies created with special remainders